Distort is a remix album by Collide, released on January 13, 1998 by Re-Constriction Records. The album was remastered and re-released with a few additional tracks for the 2006 release.

Reception

Aiding & Abetting called the music on Distort "hit-and-miss" and that "the remixes here aren't uniformly as adventurous or ambitious as the band itself, but many do well." AllMusic awarded the album three out of five stars and said "Collide continue to expand their basic industrial sound on Collide, which incorporates techno and goth elements as well as an ethereal sheen reminiscent of the vintage 4AD label sound." Sonic Boom called the collection "one of the best remix albums released in recent memory for not only the depth and extreme diversity of the remixes but for the track selection as well making this record a definite must have." Lollipop Magazine criticized the album for being a poor introduction to the band's art and unnecessary.  Ink 19 called the album "original and seductive" and stated "Distort offers a look from the remixer's mind into the eye of talent." Another critic at Ink 19 called it a "consistently excellent" album with "dancefloor prowess coupled with lyrical grace."

Track listing

Personnel
Adapted from the Distort liner notes.

Collide
 Eric Anest (as Statik) – noises, mastering, arrangements, remixer (1, 2, 4, 6), cover art, illustrations, design, photography
 Karin Johnston (as Tripp9) – vocals, cover art, illustrations, design, photography

Additional performers
 Jason Bazinet (11)
 Chad Bishop (13)
 Kneel Cohn – remixer (3)
 Mick Hale – remixer (9)
 Bruce King – guitar (2)
 Bruno Kramm – remixer (5)
 Ron McLin – remixer (3)
 Wrex Mock – remixer (12)
 Tom Muschitz – remixer (7)
 Martin Myers – remixer (8)
 Greg Price – remixer (8)
 George Sarah – remixer (10)

Production and design
 T.J. Barrial – photography
 Dave Keffer (as Creative Imaging) – illustrations

Release history

References

External links 
 Distort at collide.net
 
  Distort at Bandcamp
 Distort at iTunes

Collide (band) albums
1998 remix albums
Re-Constriction Records albums